Madhavi (born 1973), better known by her stage name Maathu, is an Indian actress who was active during the 1980s and 1990s in Malayalam cinema. She is born to Telugu-speaking parents Venkit and Shantha. She is best known for her role as Radha in the 1991 Malayalam movie Amaram, alongside mammooty.

Personal life

Maathu was married to Dr. Jacob and later divorced. They have a son, Luke, and a daughter, Jaime. She converted from Hinduism to Christianity and adopted the name Meena. In 2018, the actress who had immigrated to the United States married Malaysian native, Anbalagan George. In an Interview in 2019, she spoke about a coming back after 19 years to film industry.

Awards
 1977 Karnataka State Film Award for Best Child Actor (Female) - Sanaadi Appanna 
 1994 Kerala Film Critics Association Awards - Prathakshinam 
 1995 Kerala Film Critics Association Awards - Samudhayam

Filmography

Advertisement
 Hawalker Hawai Chappal

References

External links

 Maathu at MSI
 https://archive.today/20130827035011/http://cinidiary.com/peopleinfo1.php?searchtext=Mathu&pigsection=Actor&picata=2&Search=Search

Living people
20th-century Indian actresses
Actresses from Chennai
Actresses in Kannada cinema
Actresses in Malayalam cinema
Actresses in Tamil cinema
Actresses in Telugu cinema
Indian film actresses
1973 births